Petra Fromme is a German-American chemist who is Director of the Biodesign Center for Applied Structural Discovery and Regents Professor at the Arizona State University. Her research considers the structure-to-function relationship of the membrane proteins involved with infectious diseases and bio-energy conversion. In 2021, she was awarded the Protein Society Anfinsen Award.

Early life and education 
Fromme was born in Germany. She attended the Free University of Berlin for undergraduate studies, where she majored in biochemistry. She moved to the Technical University of Berlin for her doctoral research, where she investigated the ATP synthase of chloroplasts.

Research and career 
Fromme's academic career started at the Max Volmer Institute, part of the Technical University of Berlin. Fromme joined Arizona State University as a Professor of Molecular Sciences in 2002. She was named Paul V Galvin Professor in 2012. In 2014, Fromme was appointed Director of the Centre for Applied Structural Discovery. The following year she was selected as a Regents' Professor. At Arizona State, she oversaw the development of two compact X-ray accelerator systems, including an X-ray light source and an X-ray Free Electron Laser.

Fromme was amongst the first people to use high energy X-ray free-electron lasers to analyze proteins. These lasers, which produce extremely bright and ultra-short pulses of light, allow for serial femtosecond nanocrystallography. Whilst conventional high intensity X-ray pulses can damage the molecules they are interrogating, femtosecond pulses can permit the acquisition of diffraction patterns before the sample degrades. Femtosecond measurements allowed Fromme to establish the structure-property relationships of crucial biological systems, including ATP synthase, Photosystem I and Photosystem II. Nanocrystallography will allow for the development of more safe and effective drugs, as well as accelerating our understanding of material design for renewable energy sources. 

In an effort to design new drugs, Fromme has studied the structure of disease-linked enzymes in the human body including Taspase I. The protease is involved with cell metabolism, proliferation, migration and termination, and its dysregulation is implicated in the genesis of various cancers. By investigating Taspase I with free-electron lasers, Fromme showed that there is a critical helical region which defines the protease activity, and eliminating this region can deactiviate the enzyome entirely. X-ray Free Electron Lasers also allowed for the characterisations of Francisella tularensis, the bacterium which gives rise to Tularemia.

Awards and honors 
 2013 Science Top 10 Breakthrough of the Year
 2015 Phoenix New Times Best of Phoenix Award
 2021 Fromme was awarded the Protein Society Anfinsen Award

Selected publications

Books

References 

Academic staff of the Technical University of Berlin
Free University of Berlin alumni
Technical University of Berlin alumni
Arizona State University faculty
Biochemists
German biochemists
Women chemists
Year of birth missing (living people)
Living people